Harold B. Foss (1910-1988) was an American architect from Juneau, Alaska.

Harold Byron Foss was born November 17, 1910, in Montesano, Washington.  He was educated at the University of Washington, graduating in 1935.  That year he went to Juneau, where he formed the H. B. Foss Company.  MacKay Malcolm and Bjarne Carl Olsen were later added as partners, in 1945 and 1950.  Malcolm died in 1951, but his name remained until 1956, when the firm was reduced to Foss & Olsen.  This period was brief, and Edward Elmer Sands was added later that same year.  Foss, Olsen & Sands was succeeded by Olsen & Sands when Foss moved to Palo Alto, California in 1958.  He died there in 1988.

Foss was known throughout Alaska primarily as an architect of public buildings, of which he designed many.

Works

H. B. Foss Company, 1935-1945
 1939 - Stanley Grummet House, 603 W 10th St, Juneau, Alaska
 1939 - Walter Sharpe House, 603 W 11th St, Juneau, Alaska
 1939 - Clifford Swap House, 610 W 11th St, Juneau, Alaska
 1940 - Eielson Memorial Building, University of Alaska, Fairbanks, Alaska
 Begun in 1930 by N. Lester Troast, an architect from Sitka.
 1940 - James Larsen House, 712 W 11th St, Juneau, Alaska
 1940 - Carl Weidman House, 622 W 11th St, Juneau, Alaska
 1941 - James Orme House, 924 D St, Juneau, Alaska
 1945 - Evelyn I. Butler House, 908 B St, Juneau, Alaska
 1945 - Rebuilding of Hoonah, Alaska
 Much of the city was burned in 1944.

Foss & Malcolm, 1945-1950
 1945 - James Larsen House, 416 W 9th St, Juneau, Alaska
 1946 - Walter Stutte House, 610 W 9th St, Juneau, Alaska
 1947 - Mt. Edgecumbe Hospital, 222 Tongass Dr, Sitka, Alaska
 1947 - Petersburg Municipal Building, 12 S Nordic Dr, Petersburg, Alaska
 1948 - Rae C. Stedman Memorial School, Dolphin St, Petersburg, Alaska
 1948 - Terminal, Juneau International Airport, Juneau, Alaska
 Altered.
 1949 - Anchorage Tuberculosis Hospital, E 3rd Ave, Anchorage, Alaska
 Demolished.
 1949 - U. S. Bureau of Mines Experiment Station, 100 Savikko Rd, Juneau Island, Douglas, Alaska
 1950 - Juneau City Hall, 155 S Seward St, Juneau, Alaska
 1950 - Juneau Memorial Library, 114 W 4th St, Juneau, Alaska

Foss, Malcolm & Olsen, 1950-1956
 1950 - Cathedral Arms, 237 Lincoln St, Sitka, Alaska
 1952 - Alaska State Office Building, 350 Main St, Juneau, Alaska
 1952 - Brooks Memorial Mines Building, University of Alaska, Fairbanks, Alaska
 1952 - Mendenhall Apartments, 326 4th St, Juneau, Alaska
 1953 - Buckner Building, Whittier, Alaska
 1953 - Chena Building, 510 2nd Ave, Fairbanks, Alaska
 1953 - Andrew Nerland Hall, University of Alaska, Fairbanks, Alaska
 1954 - Chapel by the Lake, 11024 Auke Lake Way, Auke Bay, Alaska
 With Linn A. Forrest.
 1954 - Hodge Building, Whittier, Alaska
 1954 - Petersburg Hospital, 103 Fram St, Petersburg, Alaska
 1954 - St. Ann's Hospital, 415 6th St, Juneau, Alaska
 1955 - Constitution Hall, University of Alaska, Fairbanks, Alaska
 1955 - Sitka Community Hospital, Moller Ave, Sitka, Alaska

Foss & Olsen, 1956
 1956 - Parish House for Holy Trinity Episcopal Church, 325 Gold St, Juneau, Alaska

Foss, Olsen & Sands, 1956-1958
 1956 - Bethel Armory, 470 4th Ave, Bethel, Alaska
 1956 - John E. McIntosh Hall, University of Alaska, Fairbanks, Alaska
 1957 - U. S. Post Office, 113 Front St, Nome, Alaska
 1958 - Morton Stevens Hall, University of Alaska, Fairbanks, Alaska

References

1910 births
1988 deaths
Architects from Alaska
Architects from California
Architects from Washington (state)
20th-century American architects
People from Juneau, Alaska
People from Montesano, Washington